The North Star was a passenger train operated by Amtrak (the National Railroad Passenger Corporation) between Duluth, Minnesota and Saint Paul, Minnesota.  It originally operated from Chicago, Illinois via St. Paul to Superior, Wisconsin and Duluth, but was soon cut back to a Saint Paul–Duluth train.  The service relied in part on funding from the state of Minnesota.

History 
The North Star was introduced in the spring of 1978, when Amtrak moved Twin Cities operations from the Great Northern Depot in Minneapolis to Midway station in Saint Paul and combined the previous Chicago–Minneapolis Twin Cities Hiawatha and the Minneapolis–Duluth Arrowhead services into one train.  Where the Arrowhead'''s route was 148 miles (238 km) long, the North Star was a  sleeper originating in Chicago at 10:30 PM in the initial schedule. It took 8 hours 45 minutes to reach Saint Paul, where there was a 35-minute layover. It then took another 3:45 to reach Duluth for an overall schedule of just over 13 hours from Chicago.

Three other trains shared parts of the North Star route: the quad-weekly Empire Builder from  Chicago to Portland, Oregon and Seattle, Washington, via the Milwaukee Road to St. Paul and the former Great Northern beyond; the thrice-weekly North Coast Hiawatha, also from Chicago to Portland and Seattle, on the Milwaukee to St. Paul and the former Northern Pacific beyond; and the daily Turboliner  between Chicago and Milwaukee.  The Empire Builder became a daily train again in 1979 when the North Coast Hiawatha was eliminated.

There were perennial budget battles involving the North Star. In October 1981 cost-cutting measures forced the service to be converted to a Twin Cities–Duluth local, which left the daily Empire Builder as the only Chicago–Twin Cities connection. No effort was made to link the schedules of the two trains.  At this time, the schedule was 3 hours 35 minutes from Saint Paul to Duluth. It briefly stopped service in September 1982 when Amtrak requested $27,000 in funding to keep it operating as a weekend and peak period train.  Duluth businessman Jeno Paulucci offered a $25,000 donation, with the rest intended to be covered from some other source. U.S. Senator David Durenberger (R-MN) also requested that Amtrak run a financial audit, which uncovered an extra $100,000 in available funds.

By the end of service in 1985, the North Star'' no longer served Superior and made intermediate stops only in Cambridge and Sandstone. State funding ran out in March 1985, and the train made its final run on April 7 of that year.

See also 
North Shore Scenic Railroad
Northern Lights Express, a proposed restoration of passenger rail service between the Twin Cities and Duluth

References

External links 
1984 timetable

Former Amtrak routes
Passenger rail transportation in Illinois
Passenger rail transportation in Minnesota
Passenger rail transportation in Wisconsin
Night trains of the United States
Railway services introduced in 1978
Railway services discontinued in 1985